Lily Hanbury (1873 – 5 March 1908) was an English stage performer.

Hanbury was born Lilian Florence Alcock, the daughter of Elizabeth (née Davis) and Matthew Henry Alcock. Educated in London, her début was in an 1888 revival of W. S. Gilbert's Pygmalion and Galatea; and later she appeared on most of the leading stages of the English metropolis. Her extensive career included playing 'Countess Wintersen' in The Stranger, 'Hetty Preene' in G. R. Sims's Lights o' London, and 'Petra' in Ibsen's Enemy of the People.

Hanbury reached the peak of her popularity by playing a number of parts in Shakespearian plays, mainly under the management of Wilson Barrett and Herbert Beerbohm Tree.

On 18 April 1905 she married chartered accountant Herbert Guedella (1874-1940) at the Register Office in Hanover Square, giving her age as 29 (she was actually 32).

She died on 5 March 1908 of medical complications following the delivery of a still-born child. Her remains were cremated and her ashes interred at Willesden Jewish Cemetery.

Hanbury's younger sister, Hilda, also an actress and also at one time a member of Beerbohm Tree's theatrical company, is the grandmother of Edward Fox and James Fox and the great-grandmother of Freddie, Emilia, and Laurence Fox.

Lily and her sister Hilda had a pet dog named "Wobbles" who died in 1900 and is buried in Hyde Park pet cemetery.

References

External links

 Shakespeare and the Players

1873 births
1908 deaths
20th-century English actresses
Actresses from London
English stage actresses
Burials at Willesden Jewish Cemetery
Robin Fox family